Usha Rani Das (born 5 November 1991 in Kolkata) is an Indian women footballer who plays as a goalkeeper for India women's national football team.

International
Das was part of the Indian National Team that played Bahrain in 2011.

References

1991 births
Living people
Sportswomen from Kolkata
Footballers from Kolkata
Indian women's footballers
India women's international footballers
Women's association football goalkeepers